Vanderhoof Airport  is located  north of Vanderhoof, British Columbia, Canada.

See also
Vanderhoof Water Aerodrome
Vanderhoof (District) Water Aerodrome

References

Registered aerodromes in British Columbia
Regional District of Bulkley-Nechako